God's Outlaw is a lost 1919 American silent Western comedy film directed by Christy Cabanne. It stars Francis X. Bushman, Beverly Bayne, and Helen Dunbar, and was released on July 7, 1919.

Cast list
 Francis X. Bushman as Andrew Craig
 Beverly Bayne as Ruth Heatherly
 Helen Dunbar as Mrs. Heatherly
 Samuel Framer as Rufus Sanborn
 Charles Fang as Wu Sing
 Belle Bruce as Edith
 Valentine Mott as Percy Smallwood
 Emily Chichester as Lonesome Lizzie

References

External links 
 
 
 
 
 lantern slide(Wayback Machine)

1919 Western (genre) films
American black-and-white films
1919 lost films
1919 films
Lost American films
Lost Western (genre) films
Silent American Western (genre) films
1910s American films